Mangan subdivision is one of the two sub-districts of North Sikkim district, in the state of Sikkim, India. Mangan is the headquarters. It contains 46 census-designated villages:

Naga-Namgor
Meyong
Singchit
Pakshep
Kazor
Sentam
Salim Pakel
Lingthem
Lingdem
Tingbong
Lingzah-Tolung
Sakyong-Pentong
Lum
Sangtok
Gor
Gnon-Samdong
Hee-Gyathang
Barfok
Lingdong
Zimchung
Singhik
Ringhim
Nampatam
Tingchim
Upper Mangshila
Lower Mangshila
Namok
Sheyam
Tangyek
Ramthamg
Rongong
Tumlong
Phodong
Chawang
Phamtam
Men-Rongong
Paney-Phensong
Labi
Kabi
Tingda
Upper Dzongu Forest Block
Lower Dzongu Forest Block
Naga Forest Block
Mangan Forest Block
Phodong Forest Block
Kabi Forest Block

References

Mangan district